A parge coat is a thin coat of a cementitious or polymeric mortar applied to concrete or masonry for refinement of the surface. Pargeting is a more involved process, involving designs in relief created in the surface.

Parging is usually applied with a trowel and pressed into the existing surface.  The intent is to create a contiguous surface by filling imperfections such as surface air voids created by bughole-induced outgassing, to level a surface for aesthetic reasons, or to prepare a surface for topcoating with an additional form of protective coating.

Parging is a low-cost alternative to repointing, providing structural cohesiveness to masonry walls whose mortar has begun to fail.  Parge coating can also be used to create air tightness for apartments.

See also

Damp proofing

Concrete